A yer is either of two letters in Cyrillic alphabets, ъ (ѥръ, jerŭ) and ь (ѥрь, jerĭ). They originally represented phonemically the "ultra-short" vowels in Slavic languages, including Old Church Slavonic, and are collectively known as the yers.

In all modern Slavic languages, they either evolved into various "full" vowels or disappeared, in some cases causing the palatalization of adjacent consonants. The only Slavic language that still uses "ъ" as a vowel sign (pronounced /ɤ/) is Bulgarian, but in many cases, it corresponds to an earlier ѫ (big yus), originally pronounced /õ/, used in pre 1945 Bulgarian orthography.

Many languages that use the Cyrillic alphabet have kept one or more of the yers to serve specific orthographic functions.

The back yer (Ъ, ъ, italics Ъ, ъ) of the Cyrillic script, also spelled jer or er, is known as the hard sign in the modern Russian and Rusyn alphabets and as ер голям (er golyam, "big er") in the Bulgarian alphabet. Pre-reform Russian orthography and texts in Old East Slavic and in Old Church Slavonic called the letter "back yer". Originally, it denoted an ultra-short or reduced mid rounded vowel.

Its companion, the front yer (Ь, ь, italics Ь, ь), now known as the soft sign in Russian, Belarusian and Ukrainian, and as ер малък (er malak, "small er") in Bulgarian, originally also represented a reduced vowel, more frontal than the ъ. Today, it marks the palatalization of consonants in all of the Slavic languages written in the Cyrillic script except Serbian and Macedonian, which do not use it at all, but it still leaves traces in the forms of the palatalized letters њ and љ. In Bulgarian, it marks palatalization only when written after the letters к, г and л and represents the sound /j/ in all other cases instead.

In the modern Mongolian Cyrillic alphabet, ь is also used to represent the palatalization of the previous consonant, while ъ represents a lack of palatalization. However, ъ is only necessary for the purposes of disambiguation between a consonant and an iotated vowel in situations when palatalization should not occur, as by default it would. It is therefore rarely used. As it is not necessary to specify palatalization under those circumstances, the much more common ь is frequently used as a substitute for ъ without any ambiguity arising.

Original use
In Old Church Slavonic, the yer was used to indicate the so-called "reduced vowel": ъ = , ь =  in the conventional transcription.

Historical development

In Common Slavic, the yers were normal short vowels /u/ and /i/. Havlik's law caused them, in certain positions, to be pronounced very weakly, perhaps as ultrashort vowels, and to lose the ability to take word accent. The weak yers were later dropped, and the strong yers evolved into various sounds that varied across different languages.

To determine whether a yer is strong or weak, one must break the continuous flow of speech into individual words, or prosodic units (phrases with only one stressed syllable, typically including a preposition or other clitic words). The rule for determining weak and strong yers is as follows:
A terminal yer is weak.
A yer followed by a non-reduced vowel in the next syllable is weak.
A yer in the syllable before one with a weak yer is strong.
A yer in the syllable before one with a strong yer is weak.

In Russian, for example, the yers evolved as follows:
Strong yers are fully voiced: ь → е (or ë); ъ → о
Weak yers drop entirely, but the palatalization from a following ь generally remains.

Simply put, in a string of Old Russian syllables, each of which has a reduced vowel, the reduced vowels are, in Modern Russian, alternately given their full voicing or drop: the last yer in the sequence drops. There are some exceptions to the rule, usually considered to be the result of analogy with other words or other inflected forms of the same word, with a different original pattern of reduced vowels. Modern Russian inflection is, therefore, complicated by so-called "transitive" (lit. беглые  "fugitive" or "fleeting") vowels, which appear and disappear in place of a former yer. For example (OR = Old Russian; R = Russian):
OR сънъ  → R сон  "sleep" (nominative singular)
OR съна  → R сна  "sleep" (genitive singular)
OR угълъ  → R угол  "corner" (nominative singular)
OR угъла  → R угла  "corner" (genitive singular)

Sources

External links

Cyrillic letters